Teen humor comics are a genre of comics that humorously depict contemporary American teenagers. When teen culture and buying power emerged in the early 1940s, comics publishers were quick to glut the newsstands with light-hearted, innocuous comic books about funny teens, cars, dating, high school, and parents. Teen humor comics appealed especially to young teen girls and tweens of both sexes because the books gave them a glimpse of what awaited them in high school.

The genre's formulaic plots anticipated the radio and television suburban family sitcoms such as The Adventures of Ozzie and Harriet, and though many titles ceased publication as adult audiences turned to comics tinged with extreme violence and sex in the late 1940s and early 1950s, Archie, Buzzy, Patsy Walker and other titles had relatively long publication lives.

Background 
It was in the 1920s that American teens were first viewed as a distinct social group, aided and abetted by the black-and-white illustrations of flappers and their boyfriends produced by John Held, Jr. By the early 1940s, teens had become a significant consumer group with money of their own, and adult, rather than juvenile, tastes.  The group was ripe for exploitation. The commercial and popular success of teen-oriented films such as MGM's Andy Hardy series of the late 1930s starring Mickey Rooney and the Henry Aldrich films of the early 1940s with Jimmy Lydon, gave comic book publishers the incentive to create and develop the teen humor genre.

Archie Comics 
In 1941, MLJ Comics (later Archie Comics) introduced Archie Andrews and his Riverdale High pals into their superhero and crime buster comic book, Pep Comics. MLJ would become the principal exponent of teen humor comics.  The Riverdale teens were popular, and, by the fall of 1942, Archie had his own comic book series with stories focusing on the benign aspects of teen life – cars, dating, school, and parents. While the stories explored contemporary teen culture, they always affirmed conformity and respect for authority.

The series tapped into the neglected pre-teen female audience as well as youngsters of both sexes who would soon enter their teens to experience high school life. The nostalgic, idealized, blissful view of suburban high school life (that predicted the soon to be realized sit-com formula) assured their success. Parental approval was granted for their non-smoking, non-drinking hero who never used teen slang, fought, or disobeyed his parents and whose libido only faintly glimmered.  Archie and his pals offered youngsters a safe glimpse of high school teens who observed the rules of adult society.

Following the war, MLJ dropped all its superhero titles and focused on its teen humor line with Archie and Archie spinoffs such as Betty and Veronica leading the way.  Archie has remained in publication for years, and, in the 1990s, the title's simple, satisfying formulaic stories of middle class teens displayed little change from the stories of its first issues.

Other titles  

  
Late in 1943, DC Comics introduced trumpet-tooting, platter-playing Buzzy in All Funny, and granted him his own book in 1944.  Written and drawn by George Storm, Buzzy Brown was a scrawny, jalopy-driving, suit and tie-wearing kid suggesting Harold Teen of the 1920s.  His girlfriend Susie loved his trumpet-playing but her father hated it and tried to keep Buzzy out of the house.  Buzzy remained in publication until 1958.

Late in 1944, Quality Comics Group introduced sexy, chestnut-haired Candy in Police Comics, and gave the character her own book in 1947.  The creation of Harry Sahle, Candy was sweet and wholesome but liberated; she used slang, adored boys, and collected jitterbug platters – much to the annoyance of her parents. Timely published Tessie the Typist in 1944, Millie the Model in 1945, and ten similar career girl titles by 1947. Radio shows Meet Corlis Archer and A Date with Judy were both translated to comics.

In 1945, American Comics Group (ACG) introduced former animator Dan Gordon's Cookie, a wide-eyed, diminutive kid, in Topsy-Turvy Comics. He had his own bimonthly book in 1946.  Cast members included Cookie's irascible businessman father, his understanding mother, his beautiful blonde girlfriend Angelpuss, his slang-spouting pal Jitterbuck, and his rival Zoot. Cookie tales were full of slapstick, violent pratfalls, low-brow jokes, and gags involving unusual props. The book has been compared to the wildness of animation director Tex Avery or the wackiness of the Warner Bros. Looney Tunes.

ACG's Hi-Jinx was touted as "a brand-new idea in comics" and debuted in 1947.  The title was an unsuccessful combination of the teen humor and talking animal genres. Despite an invitation to "meet some real hepcats" and the work of Dan Gordon and Milt Gross, the title folded after seven issues.  Dozens of teen humor heroes and heroines peopled the comics of the period and included Binky, Ozzie, Junior, Jeanie, Ginger, Kathy, Mitzi, and Patsy Walker.

Aftermath 
The popularity of teen humor comics contributed to the temporary demise of the superhero genre. The light-hearted teen dating situations found in Archie and other teen titles would be reworked with a darker tone for mature female comics readers in the many romance comics that were launched in 1947 with Joe Simon and Jack Kirby's flagship production, Young Romance.

With the return of GIs from overseas at the end of World War II and the increase in adult comics readership during the post-war years, teen humor comics would be challenged in the late 1940s and early 1950s by horror comics, romance comics, and other comics genres tinged with extreme violence and titillating sexual images and situations.

See also 
 Cartoon/humor comics

Notes

References 

 
  
 

Comics genres

Adolescence